Higley was an unincorporated community in Maricopa County, Arizona, United States. Higley's ZIP code was 85236 until 2007, when the U.S. Postal Service decided to abolish it for physical addresses, the 85236 ZIP code, however, remains in use for P.O. Box addresses at the Higley post office, located on Ray Road. , almost all of Higley has been annexed into Gilbert or the neighboring cities of Mesa and Queen Creek. All that remains of Higley as an independent community is the school district, Higley Unified School District.

Geography
Higley was located at  (33.30729, -111.720314), in the vicinity of Higley Rd. and Williams Field Rd.

History
Higley was named after one of the community's first landowners, Stephen Weaver Higley, and originated as a plot of  purchased in 1905–1906.

Notes

External links
 Higley Unified School District

Former populated places in Maricopa County, Arizona
Geography of Mesa, Arizona
Geography of Gilbert, Arizona